Ozyornaya station is a railway station located in St. Petersburg, Russia.

It was constructed by the JSC Prinorskaya Saint Peterburg–Sestroretsk railway and was opened on 23 July 1893 as part of the Ozerki line under the name "Ozerki".

It was rebuilt and re-opened on 27 August 1948, as a part of the narrow-gauge Small October Railway.

Gallery

References

External links

Railway stations in Saint Petersburg
Railway stations in the Russian Empire opened in 1893
Railway stations closed in 1927
Railway stations in Russia opened in 1948
Railway stations closed in 2009